Yang Lin is a fictional character in Water Margin, one of the Four Great Classical Novels in Chinese literature. Nicknamed "Sleek Leopard", he ranks 51st among the 108 Stars of Destiny and 15th among the 72 Earthly Fiends.

Background
The novel depicts Yang Lin, a native of Zhangde Prefecture (彰德府; present-day Anyang, Henan), as having a round head, large and beautiful eyes, a straight nose, a squarish mouth, a narrow waist, and broad shoulders. Yang, who fights well with a spear, is nicknamed "Sleek Leopard" because of his lithe figure and cat-like features.

Joining Liangshan
Song Jiang sends Dai Zong to get Gongsun Sheng, who has been away for too long to visit his mother in Jizhou (薊州; present-day Ji County, Tianjin), back to Liangshan. Yang Lin, a lone wanderer, bumps into Dai at a narrow lane and immediately could tell from the latter's speedy pace that he must be the famous "Magic Traveller". So Yang calls out the nickname of Dai, who is a bit shocked to be identified by a stranger. He stops to speak to Yang, who is most ready to join Liangshan when Dai invites him. 

While the two try to locate Gongsun Sheng's home around Jizhou, they pass by Yinma River (飲馬川; in present-day Ji County, Tianjin) and are blocked by a bandit group led by Deng Fei and Meng Kang. It turns out that Yang and Deng are acquaintances. They are introduced to the stronghold's chief Pei Xuan, who agrees to merge his band into that of Liangshan. 

When Liangshan is about to attack the Zhu Family Manor, Yang Lin volunteers to sneak into its ground to spy out the terrain and gather intelligence. He goes in the guise of a Taoist priest. However, he is discovered by an enemy patrol and seized. He is freed when Liangshan overruns the manor.

Campaigns
Yang Lin is appointed as one of the leaders of the Liangshan's cavalry after the 108 Stars of Destiny came together in what is called the Grand Assembly. He participates in the campaigns against the Liao invaders and rebel forces in Song territory following amnesty from Emperor Huizong for Liangshan.

In the attack on Runzhou (潤州; present-day Runzhou District, Zhenjiang, Jiangsu) in the campaign against Fang La, Yang Lin assists Mu Hong in accomplishing a spying mission. After the capture of Hangzhou, Yang Lin falls sick and remains at the city, thus taking no part in the elimination of Fang.

Yang Lin is one of the Liangshan heroes who return to the imperial capital Dongjing to receive awards. Although given an official post, he returns to Yinma River with Pei Xuan to be a bandit again.

References
 
 
 
 
 
 
 

72 Earthly Fiends
Fictional characters from Henan